Gail Skofronick Jackson from the NASA Goddard Space Flight Center, Greenbelt, MD was named Fellow of the Institute of Electrical and Electronics Engineers (IEEE) in 2015 for contributions to microwave remote sensing of snow. She died in 2021.

References 

Fellow Members of the IEEE
21st-century American engineers
Living people
Year of birth missing (living people)
American electrical engineers